The Flammeovirgaceae are a family of bacteria.

References

Cytophagia